Deadly Weapons is a 1974 American exploitation film directed and produced by Doris Wishman. It stars burlesque performer Chesty Morgan and porn star Harry Reems.

Plot
Crystal is an advertising executive who tracks down the mobsters who killed her boyfriend. One by one, she seduces each man, drugs them, then smothers them with her huge breasts. At the end, she finds out that her own father was implicated in her lover's death.

In popular culture

A clip from the film is featured in John Waters's Serial Mom. In 1986, Waters told David Letterman about visiting the White House at the invitation of the Deputy Advisor of Political Affairs and was delighted to find they shared an appreciation of the film.

Sequel

Double Agent 73, also directed by Wishman, is an ostensible sequel to Deadly Weapons.

Cast
 Zsa Zsa as Crystal
 Harry Reemes as Tony
 Greg Reynolds as Larry
 Saul Meth as Nick / Talent agent
 Phillip Stahl as Crystal's father
 Mitchell Fredericks as Captain Hook
 Denise Purcell as Eve
 John McMohon

Sources

See also
 List of American films of 1974

References

External links
 
 

1974 films
1974 drama films
American drama films
1970s English-language films
Films directed by Doris Wishman
American sexploitation films
1970s American films